The National Congress  is the legislative branch of the government of Honduras.

Organization 
The Honduran Congress is a unicameral legislature. The nominal President of the National Congress of Honduras is currently Luis Redondo. Its members are 128 deputies, who are elected on a proportional representation basis, by department, to serve four-year terms.

Meeting place 
Congress meets in a purpose-built legislative palace (Palacio Legislativo) in the centre of Tegucigalpa. Of a modernist design, it is painted in an array of bright colours and rests on a series of concrete pillars that separate it from the ground.

Directive

2022–2026 legislative period 
The current directive of the National Congress for the period 2022-2026:

 Luis Redondo (President) (PSH)

 Hugo Noé Pino (1st Vice-President) (LIBRE)
 Edgardo Casaña (2nd Vice-President) (LIBRE)
 Rasel Tomé (3rd Vice-President) (LIBRE)
 Scherly Arriaga (4th Vice-President) (LIBRE)
 Iroshka Elvir (5th Vice-President) (PSH)
 Fátima Mena (6th Vice-President) (PSH)
 Ricardo Elencoff (7th Vice-President)  (PLH)
 Christian Josué Hernández (Alternate Vice-President) (LIBRE)
 Kritza Pérez (Alternate Vice-President) (PLH)
 Issis Cuellar (Alternate Vice-President) (LIBRE)
Carlos Alexis Raudales (Alternate Vice-President) (DC)
 Carlos Zelaya (General Secretary) (LIBRE)

 Luz Angelica Smith (2nd Secretary) (LIBRE)
 Fabricio Sandoval (1st Pro-Secretary) (LIBRE)
 Linda Donaire (2nd Pro-Secretary) (LIBRE)
 Juan Barahona (Alternate Secretary) (LIBRE)
 Silvia Ayala (Alternate Secretary) (LIBRE)

2018–2022 legislative period
The directive of the National Congress for the period 2018-2022:
Mauricio Oliva (President) (PNH)
Antonio César Rivera (1st Vice-President) (PNH)
Denis Armando Castro (2nd Vice-President) (APH)
Milton Jesus Puerto Oseguera (3rd Vice-President) (PNH)
Mario Noé Villafranca (4th Vice-President) (UD)
Felicito Ávila Ordóñez (5th Vice-President) (DC)
Gladis Aurora López Calderón (6th Vice-President) (PNH)
Román Villeda Aguilar (7th Vice-President) (PNH)
Elden Vásquez (Alternate Vice-President) (PNH)
Walter Antonio Chávez Hernández (Alternate Vice-President) (PNH)
Olga Josefa Ayala Alvarenga (Alternate Vice-President) (PNH)
Dunia Lizzette Ortiz Cruz (Alternate Vice-President) (APH)
José Tomás Zambrano Molina (1st Secretary) (PNH)
Salvador Valeriano Pineda (2nd Secretary) (PNH)
Teresa Concepción Cálix Raudales (1st Pro-Secretary) (PNH)
Rossel Renán Inestroza Martínez  (2nd Pro-Secretary)  (PNH)
Gerardo Tulio Martínez Pineda (Alternate Secretary) (PNH)
Wilmer Raynel Neal Velásquez (Alternate Secretary)  (PNH)

2014–2018 legislative period
The directive of the National Congress for the period 2014-2018 is:
Mauricio Oliva (President) (PNH)
Gladis Aurora López (1st Vice-President) (PNH)
Lena Gutiérrez Arévalo (2nd Vice-President) (PNH)
Antonio Rivera Callejas (3rd Vice-President) (PNH)
Milton de Jesús Puerto (4th Vice-President) (PNH)
Miguel Edgardo Martínez (5th Vice-President) (PNH)
Augusto Cruz Ascensio (6th Vice-President) (DC)
Edwin Roberto Pavón (7th Vice-President) (UD)
Rolando Dubón Bueso (Alternate Vice-President) (PNH)
Ramón Antonio Leva Bulnes (Alternate Vice-President) (PNH)
Jose Vicente de León Rojas (Alternate Vice-President) (PNH)
Mario Alonso Perez (1st Secretary) (PNH)
Román Villeda Aguilar (2nd Secretary) (PNH)
José María Martínez (Alternate Secretary) (PNH)
Wilmer Neal Velásquez (Alternate Secretary) (PNH)
José Tomás Zambrano (1st Pro-Secretary) (PNH)
Sara Ismena Medina Galo (2nd Pro-Secretary) (PNH)

2010–2014 legislative period
The directive of the National Congress for the period 2010–2014 is:
Juan Orlando Hernández (President) (PNH) 
Lena Gutiérrez Arévalo (1st Vice-President) (PNH)
Marlon Lara (2nd Vice-President) (PLH)
Ramón Velásquez Názar (3rd Vice-President) (DC)
Marvin Ponce (4th Vice-President) (PUD)
Martha Concepción Guevara (5th Vice-President)(PNH)
Nora de Melgar (6th Vice-President) (PNH)
Rigoberto Chang Castillo (1st Secretary) (PNH)
Gladis Aurora López (2nd Secretary) (PNH)
Eliseo Noel Mejía (Pro-Secretary) (PNH)
Yariel Waldina Paz (Pro-Secretary) (PLH)
Óscar Orlando Burgos (Alternate Vice-President) (PNH)
Victoria Carrasco García (Alternate Vice-President) (PNH)
Ángel Banegas (Alternate Secretary) (PLH)
Milton de Jesús Puerto (Alternate Secretary) (PNH)

Elections
The most recent election was held November 2021.

2021 Legislative elections

Changes in political groups
Some of the opposition parties, particularly the Liberal, LIBRE and PAC have faced internal division. This division had more impact on LIBRE, which  led to the dismissal and the resignation of some of their congressional partisans. During the first week of session in 2014, Congressman Eduardo Cotto was expelled from LIBRE for voting in favor of the National/DC/PUD directive integration, which was also supported by the Liberals. On the following months, Cotto joined the DC.

On February 21, 2015, Congresswoman Tatiana Canales announced her incorporation to the Liberal Party, after failed negotiations with PAC. Nonetheless, 3 days later, the authorities of LIBRE decided to expel her (even though she had already resigned) and three other congressmen after they voted against an electoral reform that was introduced to Congress by the former President and current party leader of LIBRE, Manuel Zelaya Rosales. Together, the three expelled congressmen and Canales formed an independent bloc headed by Congresswoman Jenny Murillo.

On April 9, 2015 the National Congress of Honduras processed the resignations of Congressman Hector Enrique Padilla from LIBRE and Substitute Congresswoman Claudia Patricia Molina from the Liberal Party. Since Molina is a substitute congresswoman, this change does not affect the number of members of the Liberal caucus, nonetheless Padilla's resignation reduced the number of LIBRE congressmen to 32. Later on, Padilla joined the independent group formed by former members of LIBRE

The total number of members of the LIBRE caucus was reduced to 31 after Atlántida congresswoman, Audelia Rodriguez resigned from that party and joined the independent group on May 5, 2015. Rodriguez stated that the lack of direction  in LIBRE has led to the impossibility of giving response to the people that elected her, but later she joined to the Christian Democratic Party
The Deputy of the independent group Hector Padilla has joined to the Christian Democratic Group, and with the new deputy now they have 3 deputies in the group. In the later months the congresswoman Audelia Rodriguez has joined to the Christian Democratic Party now counting with 4 deputies 

Also in February 2016, LIBRE has expelled the deputies Esdras Amado López and Dennis Antonio Sánchez of Francisco Morazán and Santa Bárbara respectively, based on the reason that they have voted in favour of a new Supreme Court of Justice. Since 4 of PAC's congressmen did not make their vote public during the Supreme Court election, Salvador Nasralla accused them of being now congressmen of the National Party, nonetheless, they have not been formally expelled of the party.

But later, on March 18, the leaders of PAC finally decided to "temporarily suspend" the membership of the 4 of the deputies that participated in the election of a new Supreme Court of Justice. The 4 suspended congressmen are Ana Joselina Fortín, Marlene Alvarenga, Kritza Perez and Oscar Palacios.

In April 2016, the deputy of the independent group Tatiana Canales, finally has decided to return to the Liberal Party of Honduras, with the reason that they have expressed differences with Libre, and its return means that the Liberal caucus has officially 28 deputies. Also on the half of May 2016, the deputy of the independent group Omar Rodríguez has decided to return to the Liberal Party now with 29 deputies on the caucus. On the final days of the month of May the deputy Dennis Antonio Sánchez has decided to return to the Liberal Party now with 30 deputies on their caucus, now the party is the second largest political group in the congress.

In July 2016, the deputy of the independent group Yenny Murillo has decided to return to the National Party of Honduras, with the reason that she is feeling changes in the form of life in Honduras, also had said that she is in favour of the reelection but with a regulation that will be established on the Constitution of the Republic, to limit how many times a president can be reelected.

Also in the final week of September 2016, the deputy of the independent group Kritza Pérez has decided finally to be a member of the Liberal Party of Honduras based on the reason that in his first party PAC, they don't allow the pluralism of ideas and discrimination against women that they have announced several times on the national media.

On the first days of November 2016, the deputy of the independent group Ana Joselina Fortín has decided to join to the National Party of Honduras based on the reason that she wants the reelection of the current president and to establish limits on how many times a president can be reelected.

On the first days of December 2016, the deputy of the department of Cortés Jaime Enrique Villegas has decided to resign from the Anticorruption Party based on the reasons that they had differences with the leaders of the party and they don't allow him to participate on decisions of importance. But later in July 2017 he decided to be a member of the National Party of Honduras and to be candidate for the general election in 2017 

Also on the same month of December 2016 the deputy of Comayagua Liliam Villatoro has decided to resign from the Anticorruption Party because she has expressed with the leader of the party Salvador Nasralla and they don't allow her to participate on the sessions of the party with new ideas.

On the half days of July 2017, the deputies Rafael Padilla and David Reyes of the departments of Francisco Morazán and Choluteca respectively, have joined to the Innovation and Unity Party, based on the reason that the two deputies they don't want their original party, the Anticorruption Party to be led by the congresswoman Marlene Alvarenga.

On the first days of August 2017, the deputies of Cortés Fátima Mena and Anibal Cálix has decided to join as deputies of the Innovation and Unity party, based on the reason that they don't want to be members of the Anticorruption Party led now by congresswoman Marlene Alvarenga. As of August 2017, none of the elected congressmen of the National Party, PINU, and UD have resigned from their respective party affiliation

On the last days of September 2017, the deputies of the independent group Walter Banegas and Lilian Villatoro of the departments of Cortés and Comayagua respectively has decided to join as members of the Liberal Party of Honduras based on the reason that their original party, the Anticorruption Party no longer exists thus, increasing the Liberal caucus to 33.

On the last days of October 2017, the deputy of Cortés Luis Redondo has decided to join as deputy of the Innovation and Unity party, based on the reason that he won't be a member of the Anticorruption party led by congresswoman Marlene Alvarenga.

Honduras also returns deputies to the supranational Central American Parliament.

President
The President of the National Congress of Honduras is the presiding officer (speaker) of the National Congress of Honduras.

Presidents of the Congress 1900-1982

List of presidents since 1982

See also
 Politics of Honduras
 Government of Honduras
 Supreme Court of Honduras
 Executive branch of the government of Honduras
 List of legislatures by country

References

External links
  

 
Government of Honduras
Honduras
Honduras